Edith Ranum (23 May 1922 – 25 October 2002) was a Norwegian crime fiction writer, novelist and playwright. She made her literary début in 1949 with the novel Efter siste akt. She has written several crime novels and audio plays. She was awarded the Riverton Prize in 1986.

Ranum was originally an actress, and started writing after she lost her sight due to illness.

References

1922 births
2002 deaths
Writers from Oslo
Norwegian crime fiction writers
Norwegian women novelists
20th-century Norwegian novelists
20th-century Norwegian dramatists and playwrights
20th-century Norwegian women writers
Women crime writers
Blind writers
Norwegian blind people
Norwegian women dramatists and playwrights